Denijal Pirić (born 27 September 1946) is a Bosnian former football manager and player.

Club career
Born in the small mining town of Živinice, Pirić started playing football at local side Slaven. Former Slaven manager Vlatko Konjevod then lured him to Dinamo Zagreb and played 8 years for the club. Pirić then joined Sarajevo. With Dinamo, he won two domestic cups and the 1966–67 Inter-Cities Fairs Cup, beating Don Revie's Leeds United in the final. He played over 350 matches for Dinamo in all competitions.

International career
Pirić made his debut for Yugoslavia in an April 1969 World Cup qualification match away against Spain and has earned a total of 6 caps, scoring 1 goal. His final international was a November 1970 friendly game against West Germany.

Managerial career
At the time a youth team coach, Pirić was given a caretaker role of the Bosnia and Herzegovina national team to take charge of a home friendly game against Azerbaijan in Zenica on 1 June 2008 after the sacking of Meho Kodro. Most players for this match were assembled from the Bosnian Premier League.

Pirić worked as a technical director of the Bosnian national teams until his retirement in November 2017.

Managerial statistics

Honours

Player
Dinamo Zagreb
Yugoslav Cup: 1964–65, 1968–69
Inter-Cities Fairs Cup: 1966–67

References

External links

1946 births
Living people
People from Živinice
Association football midfielders
Yugoslav footballers
Yugoslavia international footballers
GNK Dinamo Zagreb players
FK Sarajevo players
Yugoslav First League players
Yugoslav football managers
Bosnia and Herzegovina football managers
FK Sarajevo managers
Bosnia and Herzegovina national football team managers
Premier League of Bosnia and Herzegovina managers